Hiroyuki Fukuyama (福山 博之, born March 27, 1989) is a Japanese professional baseball pitcher for the Tohoku Rakuten Golden Eagles in Japan's Nippon Professional Baseball.

External links

NPB.com

1989 births
Japanese baseball players
Living people
Nippon Professional Baseball pitchers
Baseball people from Shimane Prefecture
Tohoku Rakuten Golden Eagles players
Yokohama BayStars players
Yokohama DeNA BayStars players